Steve Penney may refer to:
Steve Penney (ice hockey) (born 1961), Canadian ice hockey goaltender
Steve Penney (footballer) (born 1964), Northern Ireland footballer

See also
Penney (disambiguation)
Penney, surname
Steve Penny (born 1964), American businessman and sports administrator